Va'anessa Molia-Fraser (born 18 January 1996) is a New Zealand rugby league footballer who played for the New Zealand Warriors in the NRL Women's Premiership. She is a New Zealand and Samoa international.

Playing career
Molia-Fraser has played for the Bay Roskill Vikings and Richmond Roses in the Auckland Rugby League.

On 1 August 2018, Molia-Fraser joined the New Zealand Warriors NRL Women's Premiership team. In Round 3 of the 2018 NRL Women's season, she made her debut for the Warriors in a 10–32 loss to the Brisbane Broncos.

On 22 June 2019, she made her Test debut for Samoa in their 8–46 loss to New Zealand.

On 10 July 2019, she was named in the Warriors' 2019 squad but later withdrew due to injury.

References

External links
NRL profile

1996 births
Living people
New Zealand sportspeople of Samoan descent
New Zealand female rugby league players
New Zealand women's national rugby league team players
Rugby league fullbacks
Rugby league centres
New Zealand Warriors (NRLW) players